The 2018 United States Senate election in Connecticut took place on November 6, 2018, in order to elect a member of the United States Senate to represent the State of Connecticut. Incumbent Democrat Chris Murphy sought and won reelection to a second term.

The primary election was held on August 14, 2018, following a June 12 candidate filing deadline. In the November 6, 2018 general election, incumbent Chris Murphy defeated Republican nominee Matthew Corey with over 59% of the vote. Despite this, Corey was the first Republican since 1926 to win the town of Sprague.

Democratic primary

Candidates

Declared
 Chris Murphy, incumbent U.S. Senator

Withdrew
 Ann-Marie Adams, investigative journalist and founder of The Hartford Guardian

Endorsements

Republican primary

Candidates

Declared
 Matthew Corey, businessman
 Dominic Rapini, businessman

Eliminated at Convention
 Joe Visconti, former West Hartford Councilman and independent candidate for governor in 2014

Declined
 Gretchen Carlson, former Fox News anchor and former Miss America

Endorsements

Results

Libertarian primary

Candidates
Richard Lion

General election

Predictions

Polling

Results

References

External links
Candidates at Vote Smart 
Candidates at Ballotpedia 
Campaign finance at FEC 
Campaign finance at OpenSecrets

Official campaign websites
Matthew Corey (R) for Senate
Chris Murphy (D) for Senate
Richard Lion (L) for Senate

2018
Connecticut
United States Senate